Maneno Oswald (born 25 February 1970 in Dar es Salaam, Tanzania) is a Tanzanian super-middleweight boxer.

External links
 

1970 births
Living people
People from Dar es Salaam
Tanzanian male boxers
Super-middleweight boxers